The  is a diplomatic mission of Japan. It is located in Suite 1600 Tower 400 of the GM Renaissance Center in Downtown Detroit, Michigan. Its jurisdiction includes the states of Michigan and Ohio.

The Japanese government proposed opening the consulate in order to improve Japan's image with the United States and decrease tensions between the Japanese government and automotive companies. It was also established due to an increase in the numbers of Japanese businesses and residents in the states of Michigan and Ohio. Officials from the American and Japanese governments hoped that the consulate opening would ease trade-related tensions.

The consulate exists to promote trade business development and trade between Japan and the United States and to serve Japanese residents in the states of Michigan and Ohio. As of 2012 there were 18,000 Japanese residents living in those two states.

History
It was scheduled to open on January 11, 1993 in an unspecified hotel facility, which was in Downtown Detroit. Japanese officials were looking for a permanent office space for the consulate.  (榎 泰邦 Enoki Yasukuni) was the first consul general there.

In 1993 the Japan Digest reported that the Japanese government had plans to station an official who would facilitate exports of American made cars to Japan and inspect and drive the models. This would ensure that the safety and emission testing under Japanese law is done more quickly. The U.S. automotive industry had complained of delays in this procedure.

After the 2011 Tōhoku earthquake and tsunami occurred, the consulate received over 200 donations with a total of over $268,000. The consul general, Kuninori Matsuda (松田 邦紀 Matsuda Kuninori), offered his thanks to the people of Michigan and Ohio.

See also

Metro Detroit Japanese community
 History of the Japanese in Metro Detroit
 Japanese School of Detroit
 Novi, Michigan
 Niji-Iro Japanese Immersion Elementary School
 Hinoki International School
 Sundai Michigan International Academy
Diplomatic missions
 Consulate-General of Japan, Atlanta
 Consulate-General of Japan, Honolulu
 Consulate-General of Japan, Houston
 Consulate-General of Japan, Nashville
 Diplomatic missions of Japan

References

Further reading
 Stopa, Marsha. "Once-mighty Japan fights to maintain edge." Crain's Detroit Business. March 20, 1995. Volume 11, Issue 12. Page 19. Available from EBSCOHost. Accession Number 9504100032. This article is a review of the speech of Yasukuni Enoki, the Japanese consul general of Detroit, at the Ritz-Carlton hotel in Dearborn, Michigan. His term was ending at that time.

External links
 Consulate-General of Japan, Detroit
 Consulate-General of Japan, Detroit 

Detroit
Japan
Japan–United States relations
Japanese-American culture in Michigan